

 (short: Ostuf) was a Nazi Germany paramilitary rank that was used in several Nazi organisations, such as the SA, SS, NSKK and the NSFK.

The rank of Obersturmführer was first created in 1932 as the result of an expansion of the Sturmabteilung (SA) and the need for an additional rank in the officer corps. Obersturmführer also became an SS rank at that same time.

An SA-Obersturmführer was typically a junior company commander in charge of fifty to a hundred men. Within the SS, the rank of Obersturmführer carried a wider range of occupations including staff aide, Gestapo officer, concentration camp supervisor, and Waffen-SS platoon commander. Within both the SS and SA, the rank of Obersturmführer was considered the equivalent of an Oberleutnant in the German Wehrmacht.

The insignia for Obersturmführer was three silver pips and a silver stripe centered on a uniform collar patch. The rank was senior to an Untersturmführer (or Sturmführer in the SA) and junior to the rank of Hauptsturmführer.

Rank insignia

See also
 Comparative ranks of Nazi Germany
 Table of ranks and insignia of the Waffen-SS

Notes

Bibliography 

 
 
 
 

SS ranks